Henry Townsend House is a historic home located at Huntington in Suffolk County, New York. It is a -story, five-bay, center-entrance clapboard-and-shingle dwelling built about 1830.  It has a two-bay, 1-story side wing. Also on the property is a privy, smokehouse, well, shed, and garage.

It was added to the National Register of Historic Places in 1985.

References

Houses on the National Register of Historic Places in New York (state)
Houses in Suffolk County, New York
1830 establishments in New York (state)
National Register of Historic Places in Suffolk County, New York